Dirceu José Pinto (10 September 1980 – 1 April 2020) was a Brazilian Paralympic boccia player with muscular dystrophy. He won  individual and pairs gold medals at the 2008 and 2012 Paralympics in the BC4 category. At the 2016 Olympics he placed second in the mixed pairs.

He died from a congestive cardiac failure on April 1, 2020, at the age of 39.

References

External links

1980 births
2020 deaths
Boccia players at the 2008 Summer Paralympics
Boccia players at the 2012 Summer Paralympics
Boccia players at the 2016 Summer Paralympics
Medalists at the 2008 Summer Paralympics
Medalists at the 2012 Summer Paralympics
Medalists at the 2016 Summer Paralympics
Paralympic boccia players of Brazil
Paralympic gold medalists for Brazil
Paralympic silver medalists for Brazil
People with muscular dystrophy
People from Mogi das Cruzes
Paralympic medalists in boccia
Medalists at the 2015 Parapan American Games
Medalists at the 2019 Parapan American Games
Sportspeople from São Paulo (state)
20th-century Brazilian people
21st-century Brazilian people